Ptychochromoides itasy is a species of cichlid fish from central Madagascar. Until rediscovered in a pond at a tributary of the Tsiribihina River in late 2010, it was only known from Lake Itasy where last seen in the 1970s. The reason for its extirpation from Lake Itasy was likely habitat degradation and competition/predation by introduced species.

References

itasy
Fish described in 2004
Cichlid fish of Africa
Fish of Madagascar
Taxonomy articles created by Polbot
Endemic fauna of Madagascar
Tsiribihina River